Future probation is a point of view within Christian teaching dealing with the fate of the dead in the afterlife. It might also be described as the belief concerning individual eschatology. The general scope of the subject encompasses many variants that range from the Catholic doctrine of invincible ignorance through Mormon practices of postmortem baptism.

It is unique to Christian and Jewish belief and can be viewed as a way of extending salvation to all people without being dogmatically universalist.

The subject attained great prominence in the second half of the 19th century and has continued into recent times. Prior to 1800, the teaching is difficult to distinguish from universalism as many of the questions involved were framed by different cultural, prophetic and ecclesiastical issues.

A treatise on this subject by Albert Hudson, editor of the Bible Study Monthly, was published in 1975 by the Bible Fellowship Union in England. It contains both an appendix describing the history of this doctrine and a bibliography.

See also
Fate of the unlearned
Invincible error
Universal opportunity
Vincible ignorance
Willful blindness

References

Christian soteriology